is a railway station on the JR East Tsugaru Line located in the village of Yomogita, Aomori Prefecture, Japan.

Lines

Station layout
Yomogita Station has one side platform serving a single bi-directional track. The station is unattended.

History
Yomogita Station was opened on December 5, 1951 as a station on the Japanese National Railways (JNR). Scheduled freight operations were discontinued in October 1968. With the privatization of the JNR on April 1, 1987, it came under the operational control of JR East. The station has been unattended since December 2001. A new station building (consisting of a waiting room only) was completed in December 2008.

Surrounding area

See also
 List of Railway Stations in Japan

External links

 

Stations of East Japan Railway Company
Railway stations in Aomori Prefecture
Tsugaru Line
Yomogita, Aomori
Railway stations in Japan opened in 1951